The 2023 Formula Regional Americas Championship powered by Honda is the sixth season of a FIA-sanctioned F3 series across North America, and the fourth season under the Formula Regional moniker after a rebrand in 2020. The series is promoted by SCCA Pro Racing, the professional racing division of the Sports Car Club of America. Drivers compete to win a Honda-backed Super Formula seat for 2024.

Teams and drivers 
All drivers compete with Honda-powered Ligier JS F3 cars on Hankook tires. This is the last season of the championship using a Honda powertrain, with a switch to Ligier engines planned for 2024.

Race calendar 
The 2023 calendar was announced on 9 October 2022, and will visit the same locations as the season before. Each round features three races, bringing the total to 18 races over the season.

Race results

Championship standings 
Points are awarded as follows:

Drivers' standings

Teams' standings 
Only a team's two best-finishing cars are eligible for teams' championship points.

References

External links 

 Official website: 

Formula Regional Americas Championship
FRAC
FR Americas
FRAC
FRAC